USS Vermillion Bay (CVE-108) was an  of the United States Navy. She was renamed Kula Gulf on 6 November 1943; laid down by Todd-Pacific Shipyards, Inc., Tacoma, Wash. on 16 December 1943; launched on 15 August 1944; sponsored by Miss Dorothy Mott; completed by Willamette Iron & Steel Corp., Portland, Oregon; and commissioned at Portland on 12 May 1945, Captain J. W. King in command.

Service history

World War II
After shakedown and night carrier training off the West Coast, Kula Gulf departed San Diego on 5 August for operations with the 7th Fleet in the Western Pacific. Steaming via Pearl Harbor and the Marshalls, she arrived Leyte Gulf, Philippines on 14 September. During the next two months she patrolled the East China Sea out of Okinawa and shuttled planes between Saipan and Guam. Assigned to "Magic-Carpet" duty, she departed Guam on 17 November with 600 veterans of the Pacific fighting embarked and steamed to San Francisco, arriving on 4 December. From 10 December 1945 – 10 January 1946 she returned to the Far East; and, after embarking 1,520 returning veterans at Tientsin and Tsingtao, China, she sailed to the West Coast, reaching San Diego on 26 January. She departed San Francisco for the East Coast 26 February, arrived Norfolk on 16 March, decommissioned at Boston on 3 July, and entered the Atlantic Reserve Fleet.

Korean War
When the Korean War brought an urgent need for a greatly expanded fleet throughout the world, Kula Gulf recommissioned at Boston on 15 February 1951, Captain Alden D. Schwarz in command. After shakedown out of Guantánamo Bay, Cuba, the escort carrier departed Norfolk on 6 August and carried a cargo of airplanes to Casablanca, French Morocco. Following her return to Norfolk on 1 September, she spent the next 15 months training pilots of helicopter, air-antisubmarine, and fighter squadrons to strengthen U.S. forces in Korea.

In May 1952, Kula Gulf supported Marine helicopter maneuvers on Vieques Island, Puerto Rico, and in October, she operated as ASW screen to troop transports bound for Labrador. Following a modernization overhaul from January–July 1953, she resumed air-antisubmarine maneuvers in the Caribbean and off the Atlantic coast.

From 1953 to 1955, Kula Gulf helped perfect ASW techniques by participating in search and kill exercises with ships of the Atlantic Fleet. She played an important role in the development of more effective antisubmarine warfare tactics that help the Navy control the seas. In addition to ASW development, she also aided the advancement of helicopter warfare tactics, which are now so important during the struggle to repel Communist aggression in South Vietnam. Kula Gulf supported Marine vertical assault landing exercises at Vieques Island between February and April 1955. After returning to Norfolk on 26 April, she entered Boston Naval Shipyard on 13 May and Philadelphia Naval Shipyard on 19 August for inactivation overhauls. She decommissioned at Philadelphia on 15 December 1955 and joined the Atlantic Reserve Fleet. She was reclassified AKV-8 on 7 May 1959.

Vietnam War
As Communist aggression in South Vietnam increased, the United States expanded efforts to protect the integrity and independence of the Republic of Vietnam (South Vietnam). This assistance posed vast logistic demands and created the need for additional sea power. Because of this urgent need, Kula Gulf was transferred to Military Sealift Command on 30 June 1965 for use as an aircraft ferry. In the summer of 1965, she carried helicopters and troops of the 1st Cavalry Division from the East Coast to Vietnam. She continued aircraft shuttle operations between West Coast ports and American bases along the coast of South Vietnam into 1967.

Kula Gulf was decommissioned on 6 October 1969, struck from the Naval Vessel Register on 15 September 1970, and sold for scrap in 1971.

Awards
 Asiatic-Pacific Campaign Medal
 World War II Victory Medal
 Navy Occupation Medal with "ASIA" and "EUROPE" clasps
 China Service Medal
 National Defense Service Medal with star
 Vietnam Service Medal
 Republic of Vietnam Campaign Medal

References

External links
  navsource.org: USS Kula Gulf
 hazegray.org: USS Kula Gulf
 http://www.battleships-cruisers.co.uk/commencement.htm

Commencement Bay-class escort carriers
World War II escort aircraft carriers of the United States
Cold War aircraft carriers of the United States
Ships built in Tacoma, Washington
1944 ships